Asaman is a village in the Afigya Sekyere District of Ashanti. The village is known for the Konadu Yiadom Secondary School.  The school is a second cycle institution.

References

Populated places in the Ashanti Region